Oliver Twist is a 1974 American animated adventure musical drama film directed by Hal Sutherland that is based on Charles Dickens's 1838 novel of the same name. The film was the second and last to be produced by Filmation and distributed by Warner Bros. Pictures. Davy Jones, who played The Artful Dodger in the original Broadway production of Oliver!, reprises his role.

Plot
In the 19th century, orphan Oliver Twist is sent to a workhouse, where the children are barely fed and mistreated. He moves to the house of an undertaker, but after an unfair severe spanking, he starts a seven-day runaway to London. He arrives exhausted and starving, and is welcomed by a gang of pickpockets led by old crook Fagin. When he is mistakenly taken as a thief, wealthy victim Mr. Brownlow brings Oliver to his home and shelters him. But Fagin and the dangerous Bill Sykes decide to kidnap Oliver to burglarize Mr. Brownlow's fancy house. Oliver is wounded, while Mr. Brownlow tries to save Oliver.

Cast
 Josh Albee as Oliver Twist
 Billy Simpson as Oliver Twist (singing)
 Jane Webb as Nancy
 Les Tremayne as Fagin
 Dallas McKennon as Bookseller, Charlie Bates
 Davy Jones as The Artful Dodger
 Larry Storch as Magistrate Fang
 Also featuring the voices of: Phil Clark, Cathleen Cordell, Michael Evans, Lola Fisher, Robert Holt, Larry D. Mann and Helene Winston.

Production
The film was announced to be produced in mid-January 1972, as part of Family Classics, a series of films based on concepts in the public domain commissioned by Warner Bros. Production for the film and Treasure Island had been finished by late 1973. The film's budget amounted to $1.050.000, with the million given by Warner Bros., and the rest put in by the studio itself.

Release
Oliver Twist was first released in theaters on July 10, 1974. According to media historian Hal Erickson, its distributor, Warner Bros., "virtually threw away the film when it performed poorly in previews." An edited version was broadcast as an NBC Special Treat special on April 14, 1981.
The movie was first released on VHS on December 5, 1994, and re-released on August 13, 1996, as part of the Warner Bros. Classic Tales series. It was first released on DVD on September 3, 2002, by Warner Home Video, through Warner Bros. Family Entertainment.

Critical reception
Variety panned the film, saying that "neither Dickens nor the youngsters watching will profit much from this one," although the animation showcasing the streets of London received praise.

References

External links
 

1974 films
1974 animated films
1970s American animated films
American children's animated adventure films
American children's animated drama films
American children's animated fantasy films
American children's animated musical films
Animated films based on novels
Filmation animated films
Warner Bros. films
Warner Bros. animated films
American fantasy adventure films
1970s musical drama films
American musical fantasy films
American musical drama films
Films set in the 19th century
Films based on Oliver Twist
Films based on British novels
1970s children's animated films
1974 drama films
Animated films directed by Hal Sutherland
1970s English-language films
Films produced by Lou Scheimer